The Italian national under-18 football team represents Italy in international football at an under-18 age level and is controlled by the Italian Football Federation (Federazione Italiana Giuoco Calcio), the governing body for football in Italy. The team was known as Italy national under-17 football team prior 2001.

The current coach is Daniele Franceschini.

The under-18 team were compose of players from Italy national under-17 football team of the previous season, as well as new call-up. The team acted as the feeder team of Italy national under-19 football team, which compete in UEFA European Under-19 Championship.

Before 2001, the name of the under-18 team was Italian national under-17 football team (as well as the current under-19 team, was named under-18). However, the age limit of the team was always under-17 (calendar age) at the start of season, or under-18 (calendar age) at the end of season. In the past, the cut-off date was on 1 August instead of 1 January.

Current squad
 The following players were called up for the Football at the 2022 Mediterranean Games.
 Match dates: 26 June – 3 July 2022
 Caps and goals correct as of:''' 28 March 2022, after the match against

References

Under-18
European national under-18 association football teams
Youth football in Italy